In Greek mythology, Eucleia or Eukleia (Ancient Greek: Ευκλεια) was the female personification of glory and good repute.

Family 
Along with her sisters, Eupheme, Philophrosyne and Euthenia, Eucleia was likely regarded as a member of the younger Charites. According to Plutarch, Eucleia may have also been used as an epithet of Artemis.

According to an Orphic rhapsody fragment, Eucleia's parents were Hephaestus and Aglaea. Alternatively, Plutarch stated that Eucleia was sometimes considered a separate goddess and the daughter of Heracles and Myrto, and as she died a virgin, she came to be venerated as a goddess.

Mythology 
In Greek vase paintings, particularly from 5th century Athens, Eucleia is frequently shown among the attendants of Aphrodite, where she represents the good repute of a chaste bride or is performing stereotypically feminine tasks. She was also referred by ancient Greek author Bacchylides as "garland-loving".

Cult 
Eucleia was worshipped in Locris and Boeotia. Plutarch states that all cities in these areas had an image and altar of her, and this is where brides and grooms would perform a sacrifice. At Thebes, her statue was created by Skopas. In Athens, a temple was dedicated to Artemis-Eucleia in honor of those who fought in the Battle of Marathon, which is referenced by Greek author Plutarch and Roman geographer Pausanias. It is likely that Eucleia was worshipped together with Eunomia at Athens, as they were served by one priest.

In Paros and Epiros, military generals (stratêgoi) offered dedications to Eucleia along with Aphrodite, Zeus (Aphrodisios), Hermes, and Artemis.

There was a sanctuary dedicated to Eucleia at Aigai (Aegae), the ancient capital of Macedonia. The sanctuary consisted of a 4th century Doric temple, a small Hellenistic era temple, and two stoas. At least two statute bases were votive offerings by Eurydice, paternal grandmother of Alexander the Great; it has been suggested that these offerings were made to commemorate Philip II's victory at Chaeronea in 338 B.C.E. It is possible that there was a statue of Eucliea in the sanctuary. In the area surround the sanctuary, at least three burials of significant people, who were crowned with golden oak leaf wreathes, have been discovered.

Notes

References
 Borza, Eugene, In the Shadow of Olympus: The Emergence of Macedon, Princeton University Press, 1992. .
 Smith, William; Dictionary of Greek and Roman Biography and Mythology, London (1873). "Eucleia" 

Greek goddesses
Personifications in Greek mythology
Children of Hephaestus
Children of Heracles
Heracleidae
Epithets of Artemis
Religion in ancient Macedonia
Religion in ancient Boeotia